WCQM (98.3 FM) is a radio station broadcasting a country music format. Licensed to Park Falls, Wisconsin, United States, the station is currently owned by The Marks Group through licensee Park Falls Community Broadcasting Corporation.

History
The station originally went on the air in 1968 as WNBI-FM (after having initially been WPFP-FM before signing on; at that time, WPFP AM became WNBI as well). On September 30, 1991, the station changed its call sign to the current WCQM.

References

External links

FCC History Cards for WCQM

CQM
Country radio stations in the United States
Radio stations established in 1968
1968 establishments in Wisconsin